César Alexander Larios Flores (born April 21, 1988 in Santa Ana, El Salvador) is a Salvadoran professional footballer.

Club career
Larios came through the FAS youth system and made his debut with the senior team in October 2005, against Once Municipal.

He moved to Isidro Metapán before the Apertura 2010 season.

International career
Larios officially received his first cap on November 15, 2006 in a friendly match against Bolivia.

He scored his first and only goal with the national team on September 6, 2008 in a 2010 FIFA World Cup qualification match against Haiti.

As of June 2011, he has earned 9 caps scoring one goal, and he has represented his country in 2 FIFA World Cup qualification matches and played at the 2009 UNCAF Nations Cup  as well as at the 2007 CONCACAF Gold Cup.

International goals

References

External links

Profile  - El Gráfico 

1988 births
Living people
Sportspeople from Santa Ana, El Salvador
Association football forwards
Salvadoran footballers
El Salvador international footballers
2007 CONCACAF Gold Cup players
2009 UNCAF Nations Cup players
C.D. FAS footballers
A.D. Isidro Metapán footballers
El Salvador under-20 international footballers
El Salvador youth international footballers